The following is a list of over-the-air affiliates of the Home Shopping Network (HSN) in the United States. The network itself owns several low-power stations throughout the United States, usually under its broadcast division Ventana Television.

Channel positions denoted with a 2 instead carry HSN2.

Listings

See also
USA Broadcasting, the final iteration of HSN's former owned stations division in the 1980s and 1990s; all stations are now owned by Univision Communications

Retailing-related lists